Peppy Martin (born Josephine Ellen Martin on May 14, 1946) is an American politician who was the unsuccessful Republican nominee in the 1999 Kentucky gubernatorial election.

Early career
In her early years, Martin was an intern for Republican U.S. Senator Thruston B. Morton of Kentucky. In 1971, she worked in the office of Governor Louie B. Nunn. She subsequently launched a career in public relations, eventually running her own firm in Hart County, Kentucky. She resides in Bonnieville in Hart County.

Martin legally changed her name to "Peppy" from her given name of Josephine Ellen when she unsuccessfully ran for a seat in the Kentucky General Assembly in the 1970s.

Campaigns
In 1999, Martin ran for governor against Paul E. Patton, the Democratic incumbent. Through a change in the Kentucky Constitution, Patton became the state's first governor eligible to seek a second consecutive term since James Garrard in 1799. Martin's running mate was Wanda Cornelius, a school board member from Taylor County. In the Republican primary, Martin defeated perennial candidate David Lynn Williams (not to be confused with then-State Senator David L. Williams). The Martin-Cornelius ticket lost to incumbent Governor Patton and Lieutenant Governor Steve Henry in a landslide in the general election. 

Martin announced her intent to run for President as a Reform Party candidate in 1996 and, later, as a Reform candidate for the United States Congress in 2000, though she never qualified to appear on the ballot in either race. In 2003, Martin sought the Republican nomination for the office of Kentucky Auditor of Public Accounts, ultimately losing in the primary. Although she announced that she would be a Democratic candidate for Governor of Kentucky in 2007, Martin ultimately failed to appear on the ballot. Martin is challenging incumbent Andy Beshear in the Democratic primary of the 2023 Kentucky gubernatorial election.

Electoral history

See also
Kentucky gubernatorial election, 1999

References

External links
 WATE 6 reporting on Peppy Martin buying the Tennessee governor's toilet as inspiration for her own candidacy for governor

1946 births
American businesspeople
Kentucky Republicans
Living people
People from Hart County, Kentucky
Women in Kentucky politics
Kentucky Democrats
21st-century American women